Rafaq is the name of a settlement in Ras Al Khaimah in the United Arab Emirates (UAE), in the Wadi Qor. It was visited in 2008 by Mohammed bin Rashid Al Maktoum as part of a tour of remote mountain communities by the Ruler of Dubai.

It is the site of an Iron Age fortification.

References

Villages in the United Arab Emirates
Populated places in the Emirate of Ras Al Khaimah